Ormocerinae is a subfamily in the chalcidoid wasp family Pteromalidae.

Overview of genera 
Aditrochus - Aeschylia - Alloderma - Alyxiaphagus - Asparagobius - Australicesa - Brachyscelidiphaga - Bugacia - Cecidoxenus - Encyrtocephalus - Epelatus - Espinosa - Eurytomomma - Hemadas - Hubena - Kerya - Krivena - Lincolna - Lisseurytoma - Manipurella - Mayrellus - Megamelanosoma - Melancistrus - Nambouria - Neochalcissia - Neoperilampus - Ormocerus - Oxyglypta - Perilampella - Perilampomyia - Plastobelyta - Queenslandia - Rivasia - Semiotellus - Sennia - Systasis - Systolomorpha - Terobiella - Trichilogaster - Westra - Wubina - Xantheurytoma

References

External links 

 Trichilogaster at WaspWeb

Pteromalidae